The 2009–2010 Israeli Final Four, the fifth Israeli Final Four was held at Yad Eliyahu Arena, Tel Aviv, Israel on 25 and 27 May 2010 to determine the winner of the 2009–2010 Israeli League. The contestants were Maccabi Tel Aviv, the 2008–2009 Israeli League champion and the 2009–2010 Israeli State Cup winner, Hapoel Jerusalem, Gilboa/Galil and Elitzur Maccabi Netanya. Gilboa/Galil won their 2nd Israeli League crown, beating Maccabi Tel Aviv 90–77 in the final.

Venue
The Yad Eliyahu Arena is an indoor sports arena in Tel Aviv, Israel. Opened in 1963 with its seating capacity varying from 5,000 to 11,700, it had hosted the 1971–1972 FIBA European Champions Cup final, the 1993–1994 FIBA European Championship Final Four, the 2003–04 Euroleague Final Four, and all previous Israeli Final Four.

Results

Bracket

Semifinals
All times are in Israel Summer Time.

Semifinal 1

Semifinal 2

Third-place playoff

Final

References

IBA's official website (Hebrew)

1